Arthur Woodcock was a cricketer who played in 121 first-class matches for Leicestershire from 1894 to 1908 and appeared for London County in 1900.

During the late 1890s Arthur Woodcock was regarded as the second-fastest bowler in England, shaded only by Charles Kortright.  His 548 wickets at 22.28 included 102 in 1895 and 9 for 28 against MCC at Lord's in 1899. A right-handed tail-ender, he averaged 8.31 with a top score of 62 not out. In 1906 he umpired first-class matches.

Arthur Woodcock was born in Northampton on 23 September 1865 and died at Billesdon from "self-administered poison" on 14 May 1910.

References

External links
Cricinfo Profile

1865 births
1910 suicides
Cricketers from Northampton
English cricketers of 1890 to 1918
Leicestershire cricketers
London County cricketers
Marylebone Cricket Club cricketers
English cricket umpires
Suicides by poison
Suicides in England
English cricketers
C. I. Thornton's XI cricketers
Non-international England cricketers